Brodnica Landscape Park (Brodnicki Park Krajobrazowy) is a protected area (Landscape Park) in north-central Poland, established in 1985, covering an area of .

The Park is shared between two voivodeships: Kuyavian-Pomeranian Voivodeship and Warmian-Masurian Voivodeship. Within Kuyavian-Pomeranian Voivodeship it lies in Brodnica County (Gmina Jabłonowo Pomorskie, Gmina Zbiczno). Within Warmian-Masurian Voivodeship it lies in Nowe Miasto County (Gmina Biskupiec, Gmina Kurzętnik).

Within the Landscape Park are seven nature reserves.

References

Brodnica
Parks in Kuyavian-Pomeranian Voivodeship